Jazz Is Dead is a record label and live music project based in Los Angeles, co-founded by Adrian Younge and Ali Shaheed Muhammad.  Muhammad is one of the co-founders of A Tribe Called Quest, and Younge has worked with the Wu Tang Clan, among others. The trademark dates back to the first concert in 2017 and Younge's real frustration with ticket sales for his Midnight Hour show, but expresses the opposite of what he says the studio project is about: working with and paying homage to frequently-sampled jazz masters.
The first CD, recorded at Linear Labs, was released in March 2020 and included the work of Roy Ayers, Marcos Valle, Azymuth, Doug Carn, Gary Bartz, João Donato, and Brian Jackson.

Discography
Musicians listed are in addition to Ali Shaheed Muhammed and  Adrian Younge.

References

American jazz record labels